Hon'inbō Satsugen (本因坊察元; 1733–1788) was a professional Go player.

Biography 
Satsugen became Meijin by defeating Inoue Shunseki in 1767.

1733 births
1788 deaths
Japanese Go players
18th-century Go players